Årdal is a municipality in Vestland county, Norway. It is located at the end of the Årdalsfjorden in the traditional district of Sogn. The village of Årdalstangen is the administrative center of the municipality. The other main village is Øvre Årdal. The municipality of Årdal was created in 1863 when it was separated from the municipality of Lærdal.

Årdal is a modern industrial community, with ties to the old society of farming and fishing. It is surrounded by dramatic nature with high mountains and waterfalls. The climate is rather mild and with less rain than normal in the west part of Norway. Årdal is a good starting point to explore the wild nature of Jotunheimen National Park, and with summer and winter activities within its boundaries. The Vettisfossen waterfall (highest in Norway) is located within the municipality.

The  municipality is the 119th largest by area out of the 356 municipalities in Norway. Årdal is the 178th most populous municipality in Norway with a population of 5,204.

In 2016, the chief of police for Vestlandet formally suggested a reconfiguration of police districts and stations. He proposed that the police station in Årdal be closed.

Etymology and coat of arms
The Old Norse form of the name was Árdalr. The first element is the genitive case of á which means "river" (referring to the Utla river) and the last element is dalr which means "valley" or "dale". Until 1921, the name was written Aardal.

The coat of arms were granted on 9 August 1957. They are red with yellow zig-zag lines. The local economy at the time was mainly based on heavy industry, which needs a lot of electricity. The zig-zag lines in the arms symbolize both the electrical power and the industries. The colors were chosen randomly.

History
Lærdal was established as a municipality on 1 January 1838 (see formannskapsdistrikt law). The original municipality was identical to the Lærdal parish (prestegjeld) including the sub-parish of Aardal. In 1863, the sub-parish of Aardal (population: 1,791) was separated from Lærdal and became a municipality of its own. The spelling was later changed to Årdal.

During the 1960s, there were many municipal mergers across Norway due to the work of the Schei Committee. On 1 January 1964, the Muggeteigen, Luggenes, and Bergmål farms (population: 11) were transferred from Årdal to Lærdal.

Establishment of center for asylum seekers
From 1 August 2013 to 1 September it received 151 asylum seekers. (The municipal council had beforehand said no to establishing a center for asylum seekers, but the fylkesmannen resolved otherwise.) On 4 November 2013, one of the residents of the center was found—with a knife in his hand—on the bus from Årdal to Oslo, together with one dead bus driver and two dead passengers. The incident is known as the Triple murder on the Valdres Express, and only one male—the asylum seeker—is a police suspect. Earlier on the same day, for the first time one of the center's asylum seekers was removed (by police) in order to be deported from Norway. (After the deaths, media said that Norway has no requirement for screening the mental health of asylum seekers—unlike requirements in Netherlands.)

Government
All municipalities in Norway, including Årdal, are responsible for primary education (through 10th grade), outpatient health services, senior citizen services, unemployment and other social services, zoning, economic development, and municipal roads. The municipality is governed by a municipal council of elected representatives, which in turn elect a mayor.  The municipality falls under the Sogn og Fjordane District Court and the Gulating Court of Appeal.

Municipal council
The municipal council  of Årdal is made up of 21 representatives that are elected to four year terms. The party breakdown of the council is as follows:

Mayor
The mayor  of a municipality in Norway is a representative of the majority party of the municipal council who is elected to lead the council. The mayors of Årdal (incomplete list):
2019–present: Hilmar Høl (Ap)
2002-2019: Arild Ingar Lægreid (Ap)
1995-2002: Oddbjørn Einan (Ap)
1984-1995: Jo Ragnar Sønstlien (Ap)

Geography

The municipality is situated at the inner part of the Årdalsfjorden, one of the beginning branches of the Sognefjorden and is a gateway to the mountain areas called Jotunheimen and Hurrungane, including the mountains Falketind, Store Austanbotntind, and Store Skagastølstind.

There are two urban areas in Årdal: Årdalstangen and Øvre Årdal, with a total population of approximately 5,700. There are also smaller village areas throughout the municipality: Naddvik (Vikadalen), Nundalen, Indre Offerdal, Ytre Offerdal, Seimsdalen, Fardalen, Avdalen, Utladalen, Vetti, and Vettismorki.

Årdal is bordered to the north and west by the municipality of Luster, to the east by Vang (in Oppland county), and to the south by Lærdal.

Industry
Årdal became a symbol of modern Norway after World War II. In the course of a few years, Årdal was transformed from a scarcely populated rural community into a small town situated around the aluminium plant Årdal og Sunndal Verk. Construction of the aluminium plant at Årdal started in 1941. The purpose was to build a large aluminium industry as a part of the German war effort. The Norwegian State confiscated the unfinished plant in Årdal in 1945 at the end of the war. The plant was finished by the government and production started in 1948.

At Årdal, the aluminium factory produced semi-finished aluminium that went on to be transformed into various products in other factories. During the early years most of the aluminium was exported. The car and airplane industries were big aluminium consumers. Some finished products were made in Norway, such as Høyang kitchen equipment, kettles, and pans.

In 1986, Årdal og Sunndal Verk was merged with Norsk Hydro under the name Hydro Aluminium AS.

Churches
The Church of Norway has two parishes within the municipality of Årdal. It is part of the Sogn prosti (deanery) in the Diocese of Bjørgvin.

Attractions

Utladalen
The Vettisfossen waterfall was given protected status in 1924.

The Vetti Gard og Turiststasjon, a farm rich in tradition dating from around 1120, is set in dramatic natural surroundings. The farm has been involved in tourism ever since the early 19th century and now serves as a café and tourist information office in the summer. The Vettismorki mountain farm is located nearby.

The Utladalen Landscape Protection Area was established in conjunction with the Jotunheimen National Park. It comprises large parts of the Utladalen valley and adjoining side valleys. The area contains several old farms and mountain pasture farmsteads of historical interest.

Utladalen Naturhus is a nature center situated at Skåri, an old farm. Farming here ceased in the early 1970s. In 1996 work commenced on the restoration of the old cultural landscape, and the Utladalen Naturhus center was opened in May 1998. Run by the Utladalen Naturhus foundation, the aim of the centre is to inform visitors about the natural and cultural history of Utladalen and Western Jotunheimen. The centre also includes the Slingsby Museum.

Avdalen Gård (Farm)

The Avdalen farm is scenically situated on the mountainside above the beautiful Avdalen waterfall in the Utladalen valley. The land was cleared for farming in the 16th century. Abandoned in more recent times, the farm has now been restored to provide restaurant, accommodation and meeting facilities. The mill house can be seen in operation milling grain.

Jotunheimen National Park
Jotunheimen is a popular area for hiking in summer and skiing in winter, and the Hurrungane massif is very popular with climbers.

Indre Offerdal Museum
This old fjord-side settlement of Indre Offerdal "right down by the shore" is packed with interesting history about Årdal. Ten buildings, including a mill, sawmill, a shoreside warehouse, and farm buildings dating from the 19th century, provide insight into the beginnings of the extensive industrialization of this local community.

Scenic Views
Mountain Road from Årdal-Turtagrø:  In the summer, this road from Øvre Årdal to Turtagrø links Årdal to the Sognefjell mountain road.
Folkevegen road from Hjelle-Vetti:  From Vetti you can walk to Europe's highest waterfall ( high). The road/path passes four waterfalls.

Notable people 

 James O. Davidson (1854 in Årdal – 1922) an American politician, 21st Governor of Wisconsin
 Sigurd Eldegard (1866 in Årdal – 1950) a Norwegian actor, playwright and theatre director 
 Andreas Bjørkum (1932  in Årdal – 2014) a Norwegian philologist, specialized in dialectology
 Karl Seglem (born 1961 in Årdalstangen) a jazz musician, composer and producer
 Gunvor Eldegard (born 1963 in Årdal) a Norwegian politician, Mayor of Årdal, 2003-2005
 Odd Einar Nordheim (born 1972 in Årdal) a singer and musician known from The Voice and Stjernekamp
 Beate S. Lech (born 1974) a jazz singer, composer and lyricist; brought up in Øvre Årdal
 Tommy Øren (born 1980 in Årdalstangen) a retired Norwegian footballer with over 240 club caps

Historical society
The group called Årdal Sogelag concerns itself with local history.

Transportation
The Valdres Express stops in Øvre Årdal and has its end stop in Årdalstangen. The bus line originates from Oslo.

References

External links
 Municipal fact sheet from Statistics Norway 
 Årdal kommune 
 Årdalsportalen 
 Tindevegen 
 Opplev Utladalen 
 Årdal Sogelag—a historical society 
 Avdalen farm in Utladalen 

 
Municipalities of Vestland
1863 establishments in Norway